Sofia Ennaoui (born 30 August 1995) is a Polish middle-distance runner who specialises in the 1500 metres. She finished fifth in the event at the 2022 World Athletics Championships as the second non-African woman. Ennaoui won the silver medal at the 2018 European Championships, and a bronze at the 2022 European Championships. At the European Indoor Championships, she earned bronze in 2017, silver in 2019 and bronze in 2023. She took two individual age-group medals at the European Cross Country Championships.

She was the 2015 and 2017 European Under-23 Championships 1500 m silver medallist. Ennaoui represented her country at the 2016 Rio Olympics. She is the Polish record holder for the 1000 metres both indoors and out, and also holds national U20 record over the 3000 metres.

Personal life
Sofia Ennaoui was born to a Moroccan father and a Polish mother and moved to Poland at the age of 2. She is a soldier in the Polish Army. She went through the basic training in 2019 which resulted in an injury and her absence from the 2019 World Championships in Doha.

Injured foot meant she was also unable to compete at the postponed 2020 Tokyo Olympics in 2021.

Competition record

Personal bests
 800 metres – 1:58.98 (Chorzów 2022)
 800 metres indoor – 2:00.40 (Toruń 2019)
 1000 metres – 2:32.30 (Monaco 2020) 
 1000 metres indoor – 2:35.69 (Birmingham 2023) 
 1500 metres – 3:59.70 (Chorzów 2020)
 1500 metres indoor – 4:04.06 (Istanbul 2023)
 Mile – 4:23.34 (London 2018)
 Mile indoor – 4:30.43 (Stockholm 2016)
 3000 metres – 8:59.44 (Sotteville-lès-Rouen 2014) 
 3000 metres indoor – 8:45.29 (Birmingham 2017)

References

Polish female middle-distance runners
1995 births
Living people
Moroccan people of Polish descent
Moroccan emigrants to Poland
Polish people of Moroccan descent
Citizens of Poland through descent
World Athletics Championships athletes for Poland
People from Ben Guerir
Athletes (track and field) at the 2016 Summer Olympics
Olympic athletes of Poland
Polish Athletics Championships winners
20th-century Polish women
21st-century Polish women
European Athletics Championships medalists